Pristimantis orphnolaimus is a species of frog in the family Strabomantidae. It is endemic to eastern Ecuador. It is sometimes known as the Lago Agrio robber frog, after its type locality, Lago Agrio. It is threatened by habitat loss.

Description
It has a characteristic, elongated conical tubercle on the eyelid.

Habitat and ecology
Its natural habitats are Napo moist forests in the eastern lowlands of Ecuador ( asl). It is an arboreal frog living up to 30 meters above ground at the base of bromeliads. As an arboreal species it is difficult to observe, and little is known about this species. Sampling of 16 trees with the upper canopy tank bromeliad Aechmea zebrina in undisturbed primary rainforest in the Orellana Province yielded two Pristimantis orphnolaimus specimens, whereas sampling of the same number of trees along oil access roads yielded none.

References

orphnolaimus
Endemic fauna of Ecuador
Amphibians of Ecuador
Amphibians described in 1970
Taxonomy articles created by Polbot